Virat Kohli is an Indian cricketer. A right-handed top order batsman, he has made 75 centuries in international cricket — 28 in Test cricket, 46 in One Day Internationals (ODIs) and 1 in Twenty20 Internationals (T20Is) .

Kohli made his ODI debut against Sri Lanka in August 2008, and scored his first century the following year when he made 107 against the same team at Eden Gardens, Kolkata. His 86-ball 133 not out against Sri Lanka in February 2012 led India to the second highest run-chase by any team in Australia. Former Australian cricketer Dean Jones described the innings as "one of the greatest ODI knocks of all time". Kohli's highest score of 183 came against Pakistan during the 2012 Asia Cup; India successfully chased a target of 330 set by Pakistan and Kohli was adjudged man of the match. Following that, he made his first century as a captain while playing against the West Indies in the 2013 Triangular Series. In the bilateral series against Australia in October 2013, Kohli made two centuries in successful run-chases. The first of the two, 100 not out, was scored off 52 balls and remains the fastest ODI century by an Indian. The next century, which was scored off 61 balls, remains the third-fastest by an Indian . In ODIs, 26 of his 46 centuries have come in the second innings, and India have lost only seven ODIs when he has made a century. , Kohli has the most ODI centuries for an active player and is behind Tendulkar (49) on the all-time list.

Kohli made his Test debut against the West Indies in 2011 and scored his first century in the format during the Australian tour in January 2012. In the first Test of the 2014–15 Border–Gavaskar Trophy, he became the fourth Indian player to score centuries in both innings of a Test match after making 115 and 141. He was appointed as the captain of the Test team during the series and became the first player to score centuries in each of his first three Test innings as captain. In 2016, Kohli became the fifth player to score three or more double centuries in a calendar year. The following year, he repeated the feat and also became the first batsman to score four double centuries in consecutive Test series. His seven double centuries is the joint fourth-most by a player. In 2017, he became the first captain to score ten centuries in a calendar year. Following year, he scored eleven centuries, second-most in a calendar year to Sachin Tendulkar. In 2019, Kohli scored seven centuries which included five ODI-centuries. Moreover, he scored his highest score in Test-cricket against South Africa.  In late 2022, Kohli scored a hundred against Bangladesh in the third ODI to overtake Ricky Pointing's record of 71 centuries scored in international cricket.

Kohli had a three-year century drought until September 2022, when he scored his maiden T20I hundred against Afghanistan. The century was scored after 1,021 days from his previous hundred The innings of 122* was once highest by an Indian in T20I's, later broken by Shubman Gill (126*). In March 2023, Kohli ended his 1,204 day-long Test century drought when he scored his 28th Test century against Australia in the first innings of the fourth test scoring 186 runs.

Key

Test cricket centuries

One Day International cricket centuries

Twenty20 International cricket centuries

Footnotes

References

Bibliography 
 

Kohli
Kohli